Ma Chih-Yuan is a crater on Mercury. Its name was adopted by the International Astronomical Union (IAU) in 1976. Ma Chih-Yuan is named for the Chinese playwright Ma Zhiyuan, who lived in the 13th century CE.

Ma Chih-Yuan is one of many peak ring basins on Mercury.  It is ancient and highly eroded, unlike Raditladi, for example.

To the east of Ma Chih-Yuan is Rabelais crater.  To the northeast is Coleridge crater, and to the southwest is Sei crater.

References

Impact craters on Mercury